PUBS may refer to:

 Percutaneous umbilical cord blood sampling
 Purple urine bag syndrome